Fladbury railway station was a station in Fladbury, Worcestershire, England. The station was opened in 1854 and closed in 1966.

References

Further reading

Disused railway stations in Worcestershire
Railway stations in Great Britain opened in 1854
Railway stations in Great Britain closed in 1966
Former Great Western Railway stations
Beeching closures in England